The District of Columbia held a primary on January 13, 2004 and caucuses on February 14, 2004 during the 2004 Democratic presidential primary season. Delegates were only allocated in the February 14 caucuses.

Non-binding primary

The primary was held on January 13, 2004, a week before the Iowa caucuses. Early favorite Howard Dean won the primary. Polling two months before had him leading civil rights activist Al Sharpton 45% to 11%. Then his poll numbers went down considerably, to 27% to 5%.  The other candidates, John Kerry, John Edwards, Wesley Clark, Dick Gephardt and Joe Lieberman, were not on the ballot. Dean benefited from the endorsement of popular councilman Jack Evans. Following the primary, Carol Moseley Braun dropped out of the race and endorsed Dean.

Results

Caucuses

The District of Columbia caucuses were held on February 14, 2004. John Kerry won the caucuses.

Results

References

District
Dem
2004